Anthony Salame is an Australian comedian and former radio host, who has also had appearances in multiple Australian television series.

Early life
Anthony is the son of Lebanese migrants. He grew up in Sydney, Australia.

Career

Radio
Anthony was a co-host of the Virgin Radio morning show in Beirut, Lebanon, starting from its launch in May 2013 and departing on 17 May 2019. He was embraced by the radio station due to his previous comedy experience in Australia.

Television
 Pizza (2007), as the role of Omar
 Swift and Shift Couriers (2008 - 2011), the role of Anthony Sukor
 Housos (2011), playing the role of the service station clerk and Crystal's boyfriend/the manager at the local McDonald's
 Legally Brown (2013), in the role of Aziz
 The Footy Show (2013), appeared on season 20 episode 6
 Koala Man (2023), as the role of Sparky, Bricky and Yellow Tiggly

Stand-up Comedy
 Opened for LL Cool J at the Enmore Theatre (2009)
 Montreal Just for Laughs (Invitation Only) Comedy Festival (2009)
 Toured in the United States, Australia and New Zealand with Pablo Francisco, Jo Koy and Maz Jobrani (2010)
 Opened for De La Soul at the OMG Comedy Tour with Tahir & Hung Le (2011)
 Solo Tour to Lebanon with ‘'Live in Beirut (2011)
 Produced Anthony Salame: Is This Thing On?, stand-up comedy DVD released on 1 March 2012

 Awards and nominations 
ARIA Music Awards
The ARIA Music Awards are a set of annual ceremonies presented by Australian Recording Industry Association (ARIA), which recognise excellence, innovation, and achievement across all genres of the music of Australia. They commenced in 1987.

! 
|-
| 2012 || Is This thing On?'' || ARIA Award for Best Comedy Release ||  || 
|-

References

External links
 
 Anthony Salame's Website

Australian stand-up comedians
Living people
Year of birth missing (living people)
Australian people of Lebanese descent